Morgan Creek is a tributary of the Tohickon Creek in Bucks County, Pennsylvania in the United States, rising in Milford Township and empties into the Tohickon in Richland Township east of Quakertown.

History
The stream was originally named Bog Run as it was indicated so on a draft of Elizabeth Galloway's land in 1781 and a number of other drafts by Samuel Foulke about the same time. It was named so because it ran through the wetlands today known as the Quakertown Swamp. The origin of the name Morgan Creek is unknown, but, it may have referred to General Daniel Morgan.

Statistics
The Geographic Names Information System identification is 1181545. The Pennsylvania Gazatteer of Streams' identification is 03184.

Course
The stream has an average slope of 12.5 feet per mile (1.78 meters per kilometer).

Geology
Appalachian Highlands Division
Piedmont Province
Gettysburg-Newark Lowland Section
Brunswick Formation
The course of Morgan Run lies in the Brunswick Formation laid down during the Jurassic and the Triassic and consists of mudstone, siltstone, along with reddish-brown, green, and brown shale. Mineralogy includes argillite and hornfels.

Crossings and Bridges

References

Rivers of Bucks County, Pennsylvania
Rivers of Pennsylvania
Tributaries of Tohickon Creek